MS Franziska is a German television series.

See also
List of German television series

External links
 

Nautical television series
1978 German television series debuts
1978 German television series endings
German-language television shows
Das Erste original programming
Films directed by Wolfgang Staudte